Toomorrow is the soundtrack from the 1970 film, featuring the band Toomorrow with British - Australian singer Olivia Newton-John (her first major release album).  The film was a sci-fi musical mix directed by Val Guest and was Newton-John's second movie.  It was Don Kirshner's less successful follow up to his work with The Monkees.

Band members of the band Toomorrow were Olivia Newton-John (vocals), Karl Chambers (drums), Ben Thomas (guitar, vocals) and Vic Cooper (organ, piano, saxophone, guitar, recorder).

"You're My Baby Now" was released as a 7" single with picture sleeve on RCA Records, with "Goin' Back" on the B side.

According to Newton-John's biographer Tim Ewbank, Bruce Welch tried to rescue this album by bringing in new, but well established British songwriters, to reconstruct a mk2 version of this album.  Due to the knock on effect this would have had on the film version, requiring substantial and costly re-filming this idea was shelved. A non-album follow up single by Toomorrow, "I Could Never Live Without Your Love", was released on Decca Records, produced by Welch.

Songs
All songs written by Ritchie Adams and Mark Barkan, except "Spaceport", composed by Hugo Montenegro.
<li>"You're My Baby Now"
<li>"Taking Our Own Sweet Time"
<li>"Toomorrow" (instrumental)
<li>"Let's Move On"
<li>"Walkin' on Air" (instrumental)
<li>"If You Can't Be Hurt"
<li>"Toomorrow"
<li>"Walkin' on Air"
<li>"Spaceport"
<li>"Happiness Valley"
<li>"Let's Move On" (instrumental)
<li>"Goin' Back"

2014 release on compact disc
Toomorrow was released on compact disc in 2014 by Ohio-based label Real Gone Music.

References

Olivia Newton-John soundtracks
1970 soundtrack albums
RCA Records soundtracks
Musical film soundtracks